Goodman Building may refer to:

Goodman Building (Austin, Texas), listed on the National Register of Historic Places in Texas
Goodman Building (San Francisco, California), listed on the National Register of Historic Places in San Francisco
Goodman's Buildings, New South Wales, Australia

See also
Goodman Library, Napa, California, NRHP-listed
Goodman House (disambiguation)